Baharlu may refer to:

Baharlu (ethnic group) in Iran
Baharlu, Armenia
Baharlu, Iran

See also 
Baharlı (disambiguation)